The qualifying round of the 2000–01 UEFA Cup began on 8 August 2000. The round consisted of 41 matches.

Matches

|}

First leg

Second leg

Pobeda win 2–1 on aggregate.

Basel win 12–1 on aggregate.

Gorica win 3–2 on aggregate.

Rapid Wien win 6–0 on aggregate.

Club Brugge win 6–1 on aggregate.

Hearts win 5–0 on aggregate.

AB win 9–0 on aggregate.

Örgryte win 3–1 on aggregate.

Košice win 4–2 on aggregate.

Napredak Kruševac win 6–2 on aggregate.

MTK Budapest win 5–2 on aggregate.

Vorskla Poltava win 4–0 on aggregate.

Gent win 6–2 on aggregate.

Halmstad win 11–0 on aggregate.

Vasas win 4–3 on aggregate.

Celtic win 11–0 on aggregate.

Drnovice win 4–0 on aggregate.

APOEL win 5–2 on aggregate.

Rapid București win 3–1 on aggregate.

Beitar Jerusalem win 4–1 on aggregate.

Naftex Burgas win 2–1 on aggregate.

Wisła Kraków win 3–1 on aggregate.

Olimpija Ljubljana win 3–0 on aggregate.

Antalyaspor win 7–0 on aggregate.

Ruch Chorzów win 7–2 on aggregate.

2–2 on aggregate; Bohemians won on away goals.

IFK Norrköping win 4–1 on aggregate.

Brann win 2–1 on aggregate.

1–1 on aggregate; Maccabi Haifa win on away goals.

Slovan Bratislava win 4–0 on aggregate.

Partizan win 5–3 on aggregate.

CSKA Sofia win 11–2 on aggregate.

AIK win 3–0 on aggregate.

HJK win 3–2 on aggregate.

Lillestrøm win 4–0 on aggregate.

Lierse win 7–0 on aggregate.

Boavista win 5–0 on aggregate.

Rayo Vallecano win 16–0 on aggregate.

Lausanne win 2–0 on aggregate.

Rijeka win 8–6 on aggregate.

Amica Wronki win 6–3 on aggregate.

External links
Qualifying Round Information
RSSSF Page

Q